The False Dimitri is a 1922 German silent historical film directed by Hans Steinhoff and starring Alfred Abel, Agnes Straub and Eugen Klöpfer. Set in early seventeenth century Russia it portrays the rise of False Dmitriy I during the Time of Troubles.

It was made by the German major studio UFA and filmed at the Staaken Studios in Berlin. The film's sets were designed by the art director Walter Reimann.

Cast

References

External links

1922 films
1920s historical films
German historical films
Films of the Weimar Republic
German silent feature films
Films directed by Hans Steinhoff
Films set in Russia
Films set in the 1580s
Films set in the 1590s
Films set in the 1600s
UFA GmbH films
German black-and-white films
Films shot at Staaken Studios
1920s German films